Pudhumai Pithan may refer to:

Pudhumaipithan (1906–1948), Tamil writer
Pudhumai Pithan (1957 film), a Tamil-language film starring M. G. Ramachandran
Pudhumai Pithan (1998 film), a Tamil-language film starring R. Parthiepan

See also
Pulamaipithan (1935–2021), Indian scholar, poet and lyricist